Robert B. Nemiroff (October 29, 1929, New York City – July 18, 1991) was an American theater producer and songwriter, and the husband of Lorraine Hansberry.

Nemiroff was a book editor and a music publisher, as well as an award-winning songwriter. With co-writer Burt D’Lugoff, he composed the 1956 hit song "Cindy, Oh Cindy", and "Fifteen", the theme for the movie The World, the Flesh, and the Devil.

He married Lorraine Hansberry in 1953, which Hansberry often cited as an important creative factor in the genesis of her play A Raisin in the Sun. Although the couple separated in 1957 and divorced in 1962, their professional relationship lasted until Hansberry's death from cancer in January 1965. In 1967, he married Jewell Handy Gresham, a playwright.

Nemiroff devoted much of his life to editing and promoting the work of Hansberry, who had named him as her literary executor. He was the executive producer of the 1989 PBS production of A Raisin in the Sun, and produced and co-wrote the 1973 Broadway musical Raisin, based on A Raisin in the Sun.

Awards and honors
Nemiroff won the Tony Award for producing Raisin.

References

External links

1929 births
1991 deaths
Writers from New York City
American theatre managers and producers
Songwriters from New York (state)